The 10th season of the television series Arthur was originally produced in 2006 and broadcast on PBS in the United States from May 15 to 26, 2006 and contains 10 episodes. The DVD set for the season was released in region 1 on March 25, 2008. This included downloadable teaching materials and described video for the visually impaired. The season's guest stars are Édgar Rentería, Mike Timlin, Johnny Damon, and Ming Tsai. This is the last season in which Jason Szwimmer voices D.W. This is the second season of Arthur where the episodes aired in one month, following season 4.

2006 was marked as a 10-year milestone for the TV series Arthur and a 30-year milestone of the book series by Marc Brown. In celebration, a contest was run on the Arthur website called "Crazy 10's Scavenger Hunt", where viewers would search for hidden "10"s on the season's episodes for a chance to win a prize.

Episodes

References
Specific

General
 
 
 
 

2006 American television seasons
Arthur (TV series) seasons
2006 Canadian television seasons